Cephalaria gigantea (syn. Scabiosa gigantea), the giant scabious or yellow scabious, is a species of flowering plant in the honeysuckle family Caprifoliaceae. It is native to the Caucasus (Armenia, Georgia and Azerbaijan) and Turkey, but also cultivated as an ornamental.

This erect perennial has deciduous leaves, and pale yellow, ruffled flower heads in summer. The flowers resemble those of the closely related scabious plants.

References

gigantea
Flora of Azerbaijan
Flora of Armenia
Flora of Georgia (country)
Flora of Turkey